Sirjan is a city in Kerman Province, Iran.

Sirjan may refer to:
 Sirjan County, in Kerman Province
 Sirjan, Birjand, South Khorasan
 Serijan, South Khorasan